55th meridian may refer to:

55th meridian east, a line of longitude east of the Greenwich Meridian
55th meridian west, a line of longitude west of the Greenwich Meridian